Batinac is a village in the municipality of Ćuprija, Serbia. According to the 2011 census, the village has a population of 725 people. This has reduced since the 2002 census.

References

Populated places in Pomoravlje District